Niger sent a delegation to compete at the 2008 Summer Paralympics in Beijing, People's Republic of China. According to official records, the country's only representative was powerlifter Zakari Amadou.

Powerlifting

Men

See also
Niger at the Paralympics
Niger at the 2008 Summer Olympics

References

External links
International Paralympic Committee
Beijing 2008 Paralympic Games Official Site

Nations at the 2008 Summer Paralympics
2008
Summer Paralympics